Mathias Jänisch (born 27 August 1990) is a Luxembourger international footballer who plays club football for FC Progrès Niederkorn, as a midfielder.

Career
Born in Riedlingen, West Germany, Jänisch has played club football for CS Grevenmacher and FC Differdange 03.

He made his international debut for Luxembourg in 2009.

References

1990 births
Living people
German people of Luxembourgian descent
Luxembourgian people of German descent
People from Riedlingen
Sportspeople from Tübingen (region)
German footballers
Luxembourgian footballers
Luxembourg international footballers
CS Grevenmacher players
FC Differdange 03 players
FC Progrès Niederkorn players
Association football midfielders
Luxembourg National Division players
Footballers from Baden-Württemberg